Dr. Mahanambrata Brahmachari (25 December 1904 – 18 October 1999; pre-ashramite name Bankim Dasgupta) was a Hindu monk who headed the Mahanam Sampraday in present-day Bangladesh. A yogi and monk of Mahauddharan order, a school of Bengal, he was a philosopher, writer and religious master.

Early life

He was born in a Baidya family of Barishal and was named Bankim Dasgupta. He began his schooling in a nearby Pathshala primary school in 1909. At that time his father lost his eyesight. Mahanambrata therefore dedicated himself to his blind father's service, reading him aloud Hindu scriptures. He gave up English school education, being instead inspired by the clarion call of  Chittaranjan Das who called English education a 'Slave making machine'. On hearing of Prabhu Jagadbandhu who came out of his cottage at Sri Angan, Faridpur town after isolation for about 17 years from the outside world, He was inspired to travel 80 miles on foot to pay homage to Prabhu Jagadbandhu . Sripad Mahendrajee, the chief Sebait of Prabhu, brought Mahanambrata close to the Prabhu who he considered his guru.

Asceticism

His father died in 1922. After the funeral he went to Sri Angan, Faridpur to take sanyasa of Mahanam Sampradaya, the association dedicated for the propagation of teachings of Prabhu Jagadbandhu. But Sripad Mahendraji, the then spiritual master of Mahanam Sampradaya, asked him because of his youth to return home, pass the matriculation examination first and thereafter think of sanyasa. His eagerness for ascetic life prompted him to take the first available opportunity to sit for the matriculation examination. As he was out of touch with English education he had to study anew. In 1923 he appeared at the matriculation examination and obtained District Scholarship. Then he left home for good, came to Sri Angan, Faridpur and was initiated into sanyasa by Sripad Mahendraji with the name of Mahanambrata. Mahendraji, asked him to take admission in Rajendra College, Faridpur for further studies. After performing various duties of the Ashram and attending college classes, he had hardly any time for other studies. On many an occasion he had to carry on without mid-day meals because of the poor financial condition of the Ashram, and his absence during mealtimes to attend College classes. Despite these difficulties he passed B.A. Exam in 1928 with Honours in Sanskrit. He obtained M.A. in Sanskrit from Calcutta University in 1931, obtaining first class first position while sick.

Mahendraji as President of Mahanam Sampradaya received an invitation from the President of World Fellowship of Faiths, Chicago, U.S. to send a delegate to its conferences.  He sent Mahanambrata Brahmachari to represent the sampraday in the U.S. Brahmachari obtained a PhD in Vaishnava Theology from the University of Chicago. While there he had many discussions with religious thinker Thomas Merton. Merton was surprised when Brahmachari directed Merton to explore his own Christian tradition and spiritual roots rather than learn more about Hinduism. Merton acknowledged the role of Brahmachari in making him discover Catholicism.

Partition of India and beyond
After the  partition of India and Pakistan in 1947, he remained in the then East Pakistan (now Bangladesh), in order to safeguard and protect the religion and culture of minority Hindus of his motherland. After the atrocities Hindus faced at the hand of the Pakistani Army, he set up Devasthali Samskar Samity to raise funds for reconstruction of temples and reinstallation of deities. He was present during reinstallation at many places like Dhaka, Narayangonj, Brahmanbaria, Sylhet, Sunamganj, Faridpur and Chattagram. In 1975 he founded Bangladesh Sanatan Dharma Mahamondal to look after the religious and cultural interests and heritages of Hindus, being its founder President.

He was a very renowned spiritual teacher of Bengal. His disciples worship his idol even to this date as shown in the image.

References

20th-century Hindu philosophers and theologians
Bangladeshi Hindus
Bangladeshi religious leaders
Bengali philosophers
Devotees of Krishna
Hindu monks
Hindu mystics
Hindu revivalists
Linguists from Bangladesh
Vaishnavite religious leaders
The Sanskrit College and University alumni
University of Chicago Divinity School alumni
1904 births
1999 deaths